Neocogniauxia hexaptera is a species of orchid in the subfamily Epidendroideae. It is endemic to Hispaniola. The flowers are bright orange and about 2 inches wide. It grows in shady conditions from 3,300 to 4,300 ft in elevation.

References

Pleurothallidinae
Plants described in 1913
Taxa named by Alfred Cogniaux